Stephen J. Hale is an Australian bishop in the Anglican Church of Australia. He served as an assistant bishop in the Anglican Diocese of Melbourne, as the Bishop for the Eastern Region, from 2001 to 2009, during which time Hale had oversight of over 70 churches in the east of Melbourne.

Hale grew up in the Anglican Church in Sydney. He studied at Sydney University then taught at Leeton, New South Wales in the Anglican Diocese of Riverina, for four years. When he returned to Sydney, Hale studied at Moore Theological College and his first position was at St Paul's Anglican Church, Castle Hill. While there, St Paul's became the biggest Anglican church in Australia.

In 1988, Hale was invited to Melbourne by Archbishop David Penman to head up a new youth department where he served for eight years. He later became Vicar at Diamond Creek then Archdeacon of Box Hill, before becoming Bishop of the Eastern Region in the Diocese of Melbourne in 2001.

While Bishop, Hale also chaired Access Ministries and Christian leadership organisation, Arrow International.

In 2009, Hale was appointed as Vicar of what is now the St Hilary's Anglican Network, the combined parishes of St Hilary's Anglican Church, Kew St Silas Anglican Church, Balwyn and St Augustine’s Anglican Church, Mont Albert North. He served in that role until January 2020.

Hale is married to Karen and has two children and a dog, which affords him the privilege of being able to comment on canine matters in regards to the COVID-19 pandemic.

References

21st-century Anglican bishops in Australia
Assistant bishops in the Anglican Diocese of Melbourne
Living people
Year of birth missing (living people)